Mabel Kelly may refer to:

"Mabel Kelly", song by Turlough O'Carolan
"Mabel Kelly", poem by Austin Clarke in Flights to Africa
Mabel Kelly (actress), American actress who appeared in films such as Oscar Micheaux's Thirty Years Later
Mabel Kelly, née Graham, wife of Wallace Kelly and actress in his films such as Our Day
"Mabel Kelly", song by Joemy Wilson